Narsinh Mehta Award (Gujarati: નરસિંહ મહેતા પુરસ્કાર) is one of the highest awards of Gujarati literature. The award is conferred upon Gujarati language author by Adyakavi Narsinh Mehta Sahitya Nidhi, Junagadh, Gujarat. The award is held at corpuscle of  Sharad Purnima, mostly at Rupayatan, Junagadh. The award was instituted in 1999. The recipient is presented the idol of Narsinh Mehta and 1,51,000.

The award of 2013 was conferred upon Nalin Raval and Harikrushna Pathak on 18 October 2013 at Rupayatan.

Recipients

See also
Narsinh Mehta
Gujarati literature
Rupayatan

References

Awards established in 1999
1999 establishments in Gujarat
Gujarati literary awards